John Richard Bartlett (27 July 1949 – 8 February 2008) was an Australian politician, elected as a member of the New South Wales Legislative Assembly.

Bartlett was educated in the Hunter Region and attended Newcastle Technical High School (now Merewether High School). He was awarded a BA, Dip. Ed and Dip. T.L by the University of Newcastle.  He was a Councillor on Port Stephens Council for 16 years, including three years as Mayor, and was a librarian at Nelson Bay High School for 22 years.  He was married with three children.

Bartlett represented Port Stephens for the Labor Party from 1999 to 2007. He died on 8 February 2008.

References

 

2008 deaths
Australian Labor Party members of the Parliament of New South Wales
Members of the New South Wales Legislative Assembly
Port Stephens Council
1949 births
People from Newcastle, New South Wales
Place of birth missing
20th-century Australian politicians
21st-century Australian politicians